Hilda (minor planet designation: 153 Hilda) is a large asteroid in the outer main belt, with a diameter of 170 km. Because it is composed of primitive carbonaceous materials, it has a very dark surface. It was discovered by Johann Palisa on 2 November 1875, from the Austrian Naval Observatory at Pula, now Croatia. The name was chosen by the astronomer Theodor von Oppolzer, who named it after one of his daughters.

Orbit and family 

Hilda gives its name to an asteroid group called the Hilda group (or Hildas for short). It is not a true asteroid family, since the members are not physically related, but rather share similar orbital elements. The Hildas are locked in a 2:3 orbital resonance with Jupiter; since Jupiter takes 11.9 years to orbit the Sun while Hilda takes 7.9 years, Jupiter orbits the Sun twice for every 3 orbits that Hilda completes. There are over 1,100 other objects known to be in a 2:3 resonance with Jupiter.

Notes

References

External links 
 The triangle formed by the Hilda asteroids EasySky
 
 

000153
Discoveries by Johann Palisa
Named minor planets
000153
000153
000153
000153
18751102